Felimida regalis is a species of colorful sea slug, a dorid nudibranch, a marine gastropod mollusk in the family Chromodorididae.

Description
The recorded length of the body varies between 13 mm. and 35 mm.

Distribution
This species occurs in the Caribbean Sea off Costa Rica.

Habitat
Minimum recorded depth is 9 m. Maximum recorded depth is 9 m.

References

 Ortea J., Caballer M. & Moro L. (2001) Una nueva especie del género Noumea Risbec, 1928 (Mollusca: Nudibranchia) del Caribe arrecifal de Costa Rica, descrita con motivo del Quinto Centenario de su descubrimiento. Avicennia 14: 1-6. page(s): 1
 Debelius, H. & Kuiter, R.H. (2007) Nudibranchs of the world. ConchBooks, Frankfurt, 360 pp.  page(s): 181
  Johnson R.F. & Gosliner T.M. (2012) Traditional taxonomic groupings mask evolutionary history: A molecular phylogeny and new classification of the chromodorid nudibranchs. PLoS ONE 7(4): e33479.

Chromodorididae
Gastropods described in 2001